Bridget Loves Bernie is an American sitcom created by Bernard Slade. Depicting an interfaith marriage between a Catholic woman and a Jewish man, Bridget Loves Bernie was based loosely on the premise of the 1920s Broadway play and 1940s radio show Abie's Irish Rose. It stars Meredith Baxter and David Birney as the title characters. CBS canceled the show after only one season, despite high ratings.

Baxter and Birney married in real life after the program had left the air.

Overview

The series depicts an interfaith marriage between an Irish Catholic teacher (Bridget Fitzgerald) from a wealthy family and a Jewish cab driver who aspires to be a playwright (Bernie Steinberg), whom she had met at a bus stop. With a primetime slot between All in the Family and The Mary Tyler Moore Show on Saturday nights, the situation comedy was #5 in the ratings among all shows for the 1972-73 television season and obtained a 24.2 rating, tying The NBC Sunday Mystery Movie. However, CBS executives canceled the show in response to negative reactions to the characters' marriage, the show thus being the highest-rated television program to be canceled after only one season.

Supporting cast members included Audra Lindley, David Doyle, Harold J. Stone, Ned Glass and Bibi Osterwald. Lindley and Doyle played Bridget's wealthy parents, Walter and Amy Fitzgerald, and Stone and Osterwald played Bernie's working class parents, Sam and Sophie Steinberg. The Steinbergs owned a delicatessen above which Bridget and Bernie lived. Glass played Bernie's uncle, Moe Plotnik. Robert Sampson played Bridget's brother, Catholic priest Father Michael Fitzgerald; he was more sympathetic than others to his sister's marriage. Bill Elliott played Otis, Bernie's best friend and fellow cab driver. Nancy Walker was cast as Bernie's religious Jewish Aunt Ruthie and Nora Marlowe was cast as Bridget's nun Aunt Agnes in the 1972 episode "The Little White Lie That Grew and Grew."

Cast
David Birney as Bernie Steinberg
Bibi Osterwald as Sophie Steinberg 
Meredith Baxter as Bridget Fitzgerald Steinberg
Harold J. Stone as Sam Steinberg
Audra Lindley as Amy Fitzgerald 
David Doyle as Walter Fitzgerald 
Ned Glass as Moe Plotnik 
Robert Sampson as Father Michael Fitzgerald
Bill Elliott as Otis Foster

Controversy 

The series was controversial because of the differing faiths of the married characters. Some Jewish groups charged that the series "mocked the teachings of Judaism." Rabbi Wolfe Kelman, executive vice-president of the Rabbinical Assembly of America, called the show "an insult to some of the most sacred values of both the Jewish and Catholic religions." Rabbi Meir Kahane wrote an essay on the series. Orthodox rabbis met with CBS officials several times. A Conservative rabbi organized a boycott by advertisers, and Reform rabbis met with CBS staff in secret to have the show canceled. Rabbi Abraham Gross, president of the Rabbinical Alliance of Orthodox Rabbis and Educators, described the show as a "flagrant insult" to Jews, protesting that intermarriage was strictly forbidden under Jewish law. Threats followed; Meredith Baxter said, "We had bomb threats on the show. Some guys from the Jewish Defense League came to my house to say they wanted to talk with me about changing the show." Threatening phone calls made to the home of producer Ralph Riskin resulted in the arrest of Robert S. Manning, described as a member of the Jewish Defense League. Manning was later indicted on unrelated murder charges and fought extradition to the U.S. from Israel, where he had moved.

Episodes

Home media
On December 4, 2012, Sony Pictures Home Entertainment released the complete series as a manufacture-on-demand DVD set in Region 1, available in the U.S. exclusively through Amazon.com and WBShop.com.

In Popular Culture
Bridget Loves Bernie was referenced to in the MAD Magazine article "M*A*S*Huga" (its first satire of the M*A*S*H TV series) which appeared in Issue # 166 (April 1974).  The Surgeon General stated to "Cockeye Piercer" and "Crapper John" that they were put in-between The Mary Tyler Moore Show and All in the Family only because religious groups objected to Bridget Loves Bernie, which was a reference to the fact that M*A*SH was put in the time slot in between those two shows in the 1973-74 TV season after the cancellation of Bridget Loves Bernie.

References

External links 

 

1970s American sitcoms
1972 American television series debuts
1973 American television series endings
CBS original programming
English-language television shows
Religious comedy television series
Television series about Jews and Judaism
Television series about marriage
Television series by Sony Pictures Television
Television shows set in New York City
Christian and Jewish interfaith dialogue